William John McNevin (March 23, 1913 – April 13, 1982) was a Canadian politician. He served in the Legislative Assembly of New Brunswick from 1970 to 1974 as member of the Liberal party.

References

1913 births
People from Moncton
New Brunswick Liberal Association MLAs
1982 deaths